The 2001 Challenge Tour was the 13th season of the Challenge Tour, the official development tour to the European Tour. The tour started as the Satellite Tour with its first Order of Merit rankings in 1989 and was officially renamed as the Challenge Tour at the start of the 1990 season.

The Challenge Tour Rankings were won by England's Mark Foster.

Schedule
The following table lists official events during the 2001 season.

Challenge Tour Rankings
For full rankings, see 2001 Challenge Tour graduates.

The rankings were based on prize money won during the season, calculated in Euros. The top 15 players on the tour earned status to play on the 2002 European Tour.

See also
2001 European Tour

Notes

References

External links
Official homepage of the Challenge Tour

Challenge Tour seasons
Challenge Tour